Helen Cruickshank ( Gere; February 20, 1902 – March 31, 1994) was an American nature writer and photographer of birds in their natural habitats in many areas of the world.

In 1937, she married Allan D. Cruickshank, a lecturer, writer, and photographer for the Audubon Society. Husband and wife formed a highly effective partnership for photography and bird study. He took the black and white photos and she took the color slides on their bird study expeditions.

The Academy of Natural Sciences of Drexel University (formerly named the Philadelphia Academy of Natural Science) has a bird image collection named VIREO (Visual REsource For Ornithology) with over 180,000 thousand photographs, thousands of which were taken by the Cruickshanks.

Helen Cruickshank won the 1949 John Burroughs Medal for her 1948 book, Flight into Sunshine: Bird Experiences in Florida. Brevard County, Florida established the Helen and Allan Cruickshank Sanctuary, a 140-acre wildlife refuge near Rockledge, Florida. The Florida Ornithological Society sponsors the Helen G. and Allan D. Cruickshank Education Award.

Books
 
 
 
 
 as editor: 
 with Allan D. Cruickshank:  
 
 
 as editor: 
 
 as editor: 
 as editor:

References

1902 births
1994 deaths
Nature photographers
John Burroughs Medal recipients
American nature writers
20th-century American photographers